John W. Chandler House, also known as Mears House, is a historic home located at Exmore, Northampton County, Virginia. It was built in 1889–1890, and is a large two-story, frame Queen Anne style dwelling.  It features a complex hipped-cross-gabled roof clad in slate shingles; a tower with octagonal roof; a two-story, projecting, canted bay capped by a closed gable; projecting curved bay, crowned by a closed gable with Palladian-style window; and a wrap around porch with Tuscan order columns.  Also on the property are a contributing garage and sheds.

It was listed on the National Register of Historic Places in 2004.

References

Houses on the National Register of Historic Places in Virginia
Queen Anne architecture in Virginia
Houses completed in 1890
Houses in Northampton County, Virginia
National Register of Historic Places in Northampton County, Virginia
1890 establishments in Virginia